Pratteln Salina Raurica railway station is a railway station in the municipality of Pratteln, in the Swiss canton of Basel-Landschaft. It is an intermediate stop on the Bözberg line and is served by local trains only.

Services 
Pratteln Salina Raurica is served by the S1 of the Basel S-Bahn:

 : half-hourly service from Basel SBB to Frick or Laufenburg.

References

External links 
 
 

Railway stations in Basel-Landschaft
Swiss Federal Railways stations
Railway stations in Switzerland opened in 2008